Mariano Ortiz Marrero (25 July 1944 – 16 April 2022) was a Puerto Rican basketball player who competed in the 1968 Summer Olympics, in the 1972 Summer Olympics, and in the 1976 Summer Olympics. Ortiz was born in Toa Baja on 25 July 1944. He died on 16 April 2022, at the age of 77.

Honours
Puerto Rico
 Pan American Games runner-up: 1971, 1975

References

External links
 

1944 births
2022 deaths
People from Toa Baja, Puerto Rico
Puerto Rican men's basketball players
1967 FIBA World Championship players
1974 FIBA World Championship players
Olympic basketball players of Puerto Rico
Basketball players at the 1968 Summer Olympics
Basketball players at the 1972 Summer Olympics
Basketball players at the 1976 Summer Olympics
Basketball players at the 1971 Pan American Games
Basketball players at the 1975 Pan American Games
Pan American Games silver medalists for Puerto Rico
Pan American Games medalists in basketball
Medalists at the 1971 Pan American Games
Medalists at the 1975 Pan American Games